The Cast Iron Shore (colloquially known as The Cazzy) was a name given to the banks of the Mersey in south Liverpool due to the presence of an iron foundry. The Cast Iron Shore is mentioned in the Beatles' song "Glass Onion".

Background
The "Cazzy" got its name from the rust residue left after ships were scrapped on the foreshore at Dingle. Many famous ships met their end here right up to the 1950s. The area was just beyond the last of the South Docks, the Herculaneum Dock. The Beach in that area turned red from the ferric oxide left in the sand, the riverfront today in that area is now part of the promenade that joins the Otterspool promenade a little farther south.

St Michael's Church, opened in 1815, was known as the Cast Iron Church because of the extensive use of cast iron in its construction.

References

History of Liverpool
River Mersey